The People's Commissariat for Water Transport (Narodnyy Komissariat Vodnovo Transporta), usually abbreviated  ("Narkomvodtrans") or  ("Narkomvod") and also sometimes NKVT, was the Soviet Ministry for Water Transportation. It was responsible, amongst other things, for running the Soviet merchant marine fleet.

History
Narkomvod was established on 30 January 1931, in the middle of a re-evaluation of Soviet policy about the railways and the splitting off the People's Commissariat of Transportation and as part of an overall government reorganization. The first people's commissar for Narkomvod was Nikolay Mikhaylovich Ianson, who had formerly been a people's commissar in the Russian Soviet Federative Socialist Republic.

By April 1931, Narkomvod had five directorates, for operations in the Baltic, Northern, Black, Azov, and Caspian Seas. Ianson resigned on 13 March 1934, in order to become the deputy chief of Glavsevmorput. He was replaced by Nikolay Pakhomov.

On April 9, 1939 the People's Commissariat was abolished and split into the People's Commissariat of River Fleet and the People's Commissariat of Marine Fleet.

Commissars
The head of the People's Commissariat was a People's Commissar. The following People's Commissars of Water Transport were appointed:
 1931–1934 Nikolay Mikhaylovich Ianson (Nikolai Janson, Nikolay Yanson), demoted on March 13, 1934, arrested in 1937, tried and shot shortly thereafter.
 1934–1938 Nikolay Ivanovich Pakhomov, fired on April 8, 1938, arrested on the next day, tried and shot shortly thereafter.
 1938–1939 Nikolay Ivanovich Yezhov, also serving as the People's Commissar of Internal Affairs until December 9, 1938. On 9 April 1939 the People's Commissariat for Water Transport was abolished. Yezhov was arrested the following day, then tried and shot shortly thereafter.

References

Cross-reference

Sources used

Further reading
 

Water Transport